Maragall is a surname of Catalan origin. It may refer to:
 Joan Maragall - a Catalan poet
 Elisabeth Maragall - a Spanish field hockey player
 Ernest Maragall - a Catalan politician
 Pasqual Maragall - a Catalan politician, the 127th President of Generalitat de Catalunya
 Maragall (Barcelona Metro) - a station of Barcelona metro (Spain)

Catalan-language surnames